Estanislao Arceta Fernandez, Jr. (March 28, 1910 – July 28, 1982) was an Associate Justice of the Supreme Court of the Philippines. In college, he distinguished himself as a debater and orator. In the practice of law, he earned wide reputation for championing "lost cases", including a criminal case in Supreme Court of the United States. Married to Soledad Camello-Fernandez.

Early life and career
Fernandez was born in Liliw, Laguna. He studied law at the University of the Philippines College of Law and graduated in 1933, where he was a member of the Upsilon Sigma Phi fraternity. He passed the bar examinations in 1935.

Political career
In the Philippine House elections of 1941, Fernandez ran for representative of the Laguna's 2nd district under the banner of the Nacionalista Party and won. He was re-elected in 1946 and 1949 under the banner of the Liberal Party. He ran for senator in 1957 but lost. He was elected senator in 1959. He was appointed to the Supreme Court of the Philippines on October 19, 1973, as Associate Justice and served until retirement age.

In the Batasan, he was a member of the following committees: Foreign Affairs, Justice Human Rights and Good Government, Public Highways, Revision of laws, and Codes and Constitutional Amendments.

He was elected Regional Mambabatas Pambansa from Region IV-A in 1978 under the Banner of Kilusang Bagong Lipunan.

References

External links

1910 births
1982 deaths
People from Laguna (province)
Filipino judges
Members of the House of Representatives of the Philippines from Laguna (province)
Minority leaders of the Senate of the Philippines
Senators of the 5th Congress of the Philippines
Kilusang Bagong Lipunan politicians
Nacionalista Party politicians
Liberal Party (Philippines) politicians
Associate Justices of the Supreme Court of the Philippines
20th-century Filipino lawyers
University of the Philippines alumni
Members of the Batasang Pambansa
Senators of the 4th Congress of the Philippines